Lucjan Feliks Malinowski (27 May 1839 in Jaroszewice, Poland – 15 January 1898 in Kraków) was a Polish linguist, a researcher of regional dialects of Silesia, a traveller, a professor of Jagiellonian University, from the 1887 principal Seminar Slavic languages. Malinowski studied the history of the Polish language and etymology. He was the father of anthropologist Bronisław Malinowski.

He is recognized as the father of Polish dialectology.

Biography 
Born in 1839 in a territorial family in Jaroszewice. He was the son of Julian Malinowski (Pobóg coat of arms) and Ewa née Górski (granddaughter of Marcin Koźmian, who was the uncle of Kajetan Koźman, a literary critic and poet). His family  lost its estate due to repression by partitioning powers, but also due to their own irresponsibility. He had to earn a living by education. He finished grammar-school  with highest estimations from all objects. In 1861 he started Preparatory Courses in Warsaw, and the following year he joined the Warsaw University and in 1867 he graduated from the Faculty of History and Philology, receiving a master's degree in philological and historical sciences based on a historical dissertation: "On the conversion of Pomeranian Slavs by St. Otto ". After receiving the scholarship, he supplemented his studies in Berlin, Jena, St. Petersburg, Moscow and Leipzig, dealing with dialectology and conducting linguistic research in Silesia and Spis. In 1873 he published the first study of Polish regional dialects. In 1876 he obtained the title of associate professor, and in 1877 he became the Chair of Slavonic Philology at the Jagiellonian University. On 30 June 1877 he became a member of the Academy of Learning. In 1883 he obtained the title of full professor. On 4 April 1884 his only son Bronisław Malinowski was born. Lucjan Malinowski died on 15 January 1898 in Krakow of a heart attack. He was buried at the Rakowicki Cemetery in headquarters VIII.

Publications 
Zarysy życia ludowego na Śląsku (1877).
Powieści ludu polskiego na Śląsku(1900-1901)
Powieści ludu na Śląsku Wydawnictwo Literackie, Kraków 1953.
Bajki śląskie (1884).
Przyczynek do dziejów polsko-czeskich kontaktów naukowo kulturalnych w drugiej połowie XIX wieku 
Projekt Słownika staropolskiego  
Sprawozdania Komisji Językowej Akademii Umiejętności 
Ueber die Oppelnsche Mundart in Oberschlesien, Bär & Hermann, Leipzig 1873 
Ueber die Endung des Genitiv sing. masc. - neutr. der Pronominalen und zusammengesetzten Declination im Russischen und Kaschubischen, 1874
Listy z podrózy etnograficznej po Śląsku 
Powieści spiskie

References

Jagiellonian University alumni
Malinowski, Lucjan Feliks
Malinowski, Lucjan Felik
Malinowski, Lucjan Felik
Academic staff of Jagiellonian University